The Lippisch P.13 was a 1942 design for a high-speed bomber aircraft by Josef Hubert. Of highly unconventional configuration, it was a tail-less, swept-wing design with an engine and propeller mounted at both the front and rear of the aircraft. A large ventral fin gave it an almost cruciform cross-section.

At the time of the P.13's design, Hubert was working in Dr Alexander Lippisch's department at Messerschmitt; when Lippisch left the firm in April 1943, the department was dissolved and its designs (including the P.13) were abandoned.

The similarly named Lippisch P.13a and P.13b were completely unrelated projects, undertaken after Lippisch's relocation to Vienna.

Specifications (P.13, as designed)

See also

References
 Nowarra, Heniz J. (1983). Die deutsche Luftrüstung 1933–1945. Bonn: Bernard & Graefe Verlag.

External links

1940s German bomber aircraft
Abandoned military aircraft projects of Germany
Tailless aircraft
P.13